Tomasz Kupisz (born 2 January 1990) is a Polish professional footballer who plays as a winger for Ekstraklasa club Jagiellonia Białystok.

Club career 
Kupisz joined Wigan Athletic in February 2007 after a successful trial. Previously he played for KS Piaseczno in Poland. He made his Latics debut on 26 August 2008 in a League Cup match against Notts County and scored the final goal in a 4–0 win. Despite the goal, he was not given playing time in any cup matches afterward. This was mainly due to a lengthy injury Tomasz picked up shortly after.

In the 2009–10 season, he finished as the third highest goalscorer in the reserve league, with six goals in thirteen matches, playing primarily on the wing. His goals included ones against Manchester United and Liverpool reserves. However, he did not get any opportunities in the first team and his contract with the club expired in June 2010.

On 2 June 2010, the Polish side Jagiellonia Białystok signed Kupisz, who was a free agent after the end of his contract with Wigan. On 29 July, he made his official debut for Jagiellonia in a Europa League qualifying match against Aris Thessaloniki F.C., his side losing 1–2.

On 5 July 2016, he joined Novara on loan from Chievo for the entire 2016–17 season.

On 29 June 2017, he became a Cesena player.

On 28 July 2018, he joined Serie B club Ascoli on a two-year contract. On 22 January 2019, he moved to Livorno on loan.

On 13 July 2019, he moved to Serie C newcomers Bari on a permanent basis. On 24 January 2020 he joined Serie B club Trapani on loan. On 15 September 2020, he moved on loan to Salernitana with an option to buy.

On 31 January 2022, Kupisz was loaned to Reggina with an option to buy.

On 2 September 2022, shortly after terminating his contract with Pordenone, he left Italy and returned to Jagiellonia on a two-year deal, with an extension option.

International career 
Kupisz has represented Poland at under-19 and under-21 level. In December 2010, he made his senior international debut in a 2–2 draw against Bosnia and Herzegovina.

Career statistics

Honours 
Jagiellonia Białystok
Polish Super Cup: 2010

References

External links 

1990 births
Living people
People from Radom
Sportspeople from Masovian Voivodeship
Polish footballers
Association football wingers
Poland youth international footballers
Poland under-21 international footballers
Poland international footballers
Wigan Athletic F.C. players
Jagiellonia Białystok players
A.C. ChievoVerona players
A.S. Cittadella players
Brescia Calcio players
A.C. Cesena players
Ascoli Calcio 1898 F.C. players
U.S. Livorno 1915 players
S.S.C. Bari players
Trapani Calcio players
U.S. Salernitana 1919 players
Pordenone Calcio players
Reggina 1914 players
Ekstraklasa players
Serie A players
Serie B players
Serie C players
Polish expatriate footballers
Polish expatriate sportspeople in England
Expatriate footballers in England
Polish expatriate sportspeople in Italy
Expatriate footballers in Italy